Paper Rocket is an Indian drama streaming television web series written and directed by Kiruthiga Udhayanidhi and produced by Sreenidhi Sagar under his banner Rise East Productions. The series stars Kalidas Jayaram and Tanya Ravichandran in the lead roles. Music and background score was composed by Simon K King. Cinematography handled by Richard M Nathan, Gavemic U Ary ( 1 episode ) and editing was done by Lawrence Kishore.

The series was premiered on the July 29, 2022 exclusively on ZEE5.

Cast 

 Kalidas Jayaram as Jeeva
 Tanya Ravichandran as Ilakya
 Renuka as Valliamma
 Karunakaran as Tiger
 Nirmal Palazhi as Unni
 Gouri G. Kishan as Charu
 Dheeraj as Prathyush
 Nagineedu as Gunaselan
 Chinni Jayanth as Devarajan
 Kaali Venkat as Francis
 Poornima Bhagyaraj as Dr. Sheila
 G.M.Kumar as Grandfather
 Abhishek Shankar as Shankar IPS
 Priyadharshini Rajkumar as Kala

Production 
On April 5, 2022 the director herself reveals the title and first single. 
This web series got released and it has been getting highly positive reviews.

Music 
The soundtrack album and background score for Paper Rocket were composed by Simon K King, and two songs by Vedshanker and two songs by  Dharan kumar.

Episodes

Release 
The series is all set to released ZEE5 on July 29, 2022.

References

External links 
 
 Paper Rocket at ZEE5

Tamil-language web series
ZEE5 original programming
Tamil-language romantic comedy television series
2022 Tamil-language television series debuts
2022 Tamil-language television series endings